MLS Next (stylized as MLS NEXT) is a youth soccer league in the United States and Canada, that is managed, organized, and controlled by Major League Soccer. It was introduced by the league in 2020.

It is a successor to the U.S. Soccer Development Academy. The system covers the under-13, under-14, under-15, under-16, under-17 and under-19 age groups. The league currently includes 590 teams across 133 clubs.

History 
Organized youth soccer affiliated with Major League Soccer began with various MLS academy teams playing in the Super Y-League at its foundation in 1999. In 2007, the United States Soccer Federation created an elite academy league called the U.S. Soccer Development Academy, which featured academy teams of MLS teams, along with several non-MLS academies across the United States and Canada. The intention of the USSDA was to create a top division of youth soccer in the United States and Canada.

On March 12, 2020,  as a precaution against the spread of COVID-19, the U.S. Soccer Development Academy suspended operations. On April 15, 2020, the league ended operations, citing financial difficulty. The next day, Major League Soccer announced the formation of a “new elite youth competition platform intended to provide year-round high-level matches for MLS club academy teams and non-MLS academy teams that previously participated in the U.S. Soccer Development Academy.” Major League Soccer officially announced MLS Next on September 8, 2020, encompassing 489 teams across 113 clubs and six age groups. The league added 24 new clubs and expanded additional age groups for 16 existing clubs for the 2021–2022 season on June 11, 2021.

In December 2021, Major League Soccer announced MLS Next Pro, a new professional league that will complete an integrated player pathway from MLS NEXT through to MLS first teams. The league includes 21 teams and will play its initial season in 2022.

MLS NEXT Cup

Clubs 
As of September 8, 2020

References

External links 
 MLS Next

 
Major League Soccer
2020 establishments in the United States
Sports leagues established in 2020
Youth soccer leagues in the United States